The Officer Creek, part of the Lake Eyre basin, is an ephemeral watercourse located in the Far North region in the Australian state of South Australia.

The creek rises in the Musgrave Ranges and flows through the Aboriginal community of Kaltjiti in the  Anangu Pitjantjatjara Yankunytjatjara Lands.  With the Ammaroodinna and Currie Creeks, the creek empties into the Warburton River.

Officer Creek is usually a dry sandy bed and only flows at times of very high rainfall.

History
In September 1873 during his second trip into the South Australian interior, Ernest Giles and another party member, William Tietkens, encountered 200 male Aborigines.  The Europeans fired shots, allegedly in retaliation for the throwing of spears.  The Europeans escaped unharmed - there is no mention of Aboriginal casualties.  Giles later acknowledged that Aboriginal aggression was usually due to white trespass on black land.  Giles named the river where this occurred "The Officer", by which it was known until the 1930s when it was renamed Officer Creek.  Officer Creek took its name from the surname of one of the donors towards Giles' expedition that he wished to honour in that way.

See also

References

External links

Rivers of South Australia